The 1976 NCAA Men's Division I Outdoor Track and Field Championships were contested June 1−5 at the 54th annual NCAA-sanctioned track meet to determine the individual and team national champions of men's collegiate Division I outdoor track and field events in the United States. 

This year's meet was hosted by the University of Pennsylvania at Franklin Field in Philadelphia. 

USC finished first in the team standings, capturing their record twenty-sixth national title.

This was the first edition of the NCAA championships with the races measured in meters; previously the race distances were measured in yards.

Team result 
 Note: Top 10 only
 (H) = Hosts

References

NCAA Men's Outdoor Track and Field Championship
NCAA Division I Outdoor Track and Field Championships
NCAA
NCAA Division I Outdoor Track and Field Championships